Protoplasa is a genus of primitive crane flies in the family Tanyderidae. There is one described species in Protoplasa, P. fitchii.

References

Further reading

 

Articles created by Qbugbot
Nematocera genera